Ernest Robert Sears (October 15, 1910, Bethel, Polk County, Oregon – February 15, 1991) was an American geneticist, botanist, pioneer of plant genetics, and leading expert on wheat cytogenetics. Sears and Sir Ralph Riley (1924–1999) are perhaps the two most important founders of chromosome engineering in plant breeding.

Biography
After graduating from high school in 1928, Sears graduated in 1932 with a B.S. in agriculture from Oregon State University. At Harvard University he graduated in genetics with an M.A. in 1932 and a Ph.D. in 1936. Upon graduation he became a geneticist with the United States Department of Agriculture (USDA) at the University of Missouri, where he worked on wheat cytogenics (as well as wheat evolution, phylogeny, and systematics) for the next 55 years until his death.

Sears was a pioneer of methods of transferring agriculturally desirable genes into cultivated wheat from its wild relatives. Notably, he did important work on wheat genes for resistance to powdery mildew, common bunt, wheat leaf rust, and stem rust. The methods pioneered by Sears are also important for introducing genes for plant resistance against insects.

Sears recognized the importance of nullisomics in wheat. He was the author or coauthor of more than 100 articles in refereed journals, as well as 6 book chapters.

Sears retired from the USDA in 1980 but continued to work in the University of Missouri's greenhouses and in his campus office until his death in 1991. He credited part of his success to working with Lewis Stadler and Barbara McClintock. For 40 years Sears collaborated in research with his second wife.

In 1981, Sears became a founding member of the World Cultural Council.

He married in 1936 Caroline Fredericka Eichorn (1912–2001). His first marriage produced one son. After divorcing his first wife, he married in 1950 Liese Maria ("Lotti" or "Lottie") Steinitz (1916–1995). His second marriage produced one son and two daughters. In May 2001 the University of Missouri opened the Ernest R. and Lotti M. S. Sears Plant Growth Facility.

Awards and honors
 1951 — Stevenson Award of the American Society of Agronomy
 1953 — Fellow of the American Association for the Advancement of Science
 1958 — Hoblitzelle Award for Research in Agricultural Sciences
 1964 — Member of the National Academy of Sciences
 1970 — Honorary D.Sc. from the University of Göttingen
 1978–1979 — President of the Genetics Society of America
 1986 — Wolf Prize in Agriculture (shared with Ralph Riley for research done independently)
 1991 — Carl Sprengel Agronomic Research Award of the American Society of Agronomy

Selected publications

 
 
 
 
 
 
 
 
 
 
 
 
 
 
  (See Agropyron.)

References

External links
 

1910 births
1991 deaths
20th-century American botanists
American geneticists
Fellows of the American Association for the Advancement of Science
Founding members of the World Cultural Council
Harvard University alumni
Members of the United States National Academy of Sciences
Oregon State University alumni
People from Polk County, Oregon
University of Missouri faculty
Plant geneticists
United States Department of Agriculture people
Wolf Prize in Agriculture laureates